Anne Loree is a Canadian singer-songwriter from Edmonton, Alberta, Canada. Best known as the writer of "Insensitive", an international Top 40 hit for Jann Arden in 1995, Loree has also released four albums as a solo performer.

"Insensitive" spent three weeks at No. 1 on the Top Singles Canadian chart in late January and early February 1995.

Loree was nominated for Songwriter of the Year at the 1996 Juno Awards.

Discography

 Beyond Cinderella (1998)
 roAr (2002)
 The Mullet Years (2005)
 Leaving Shadowland (2005)

References

External links
 Anne Loree

Year of birth missing (living people)
Living people
Canadian women singer-songwriters
Canadian women pop singers
Musicians from Edmonton